David Gugganig (born 10 February 1997) is an Austrian professional footballer who plays for Wolfsberger AC.

Club career
He made his Austrian Football First League debut for FC Liefering on 6 March 2015 in a game against FC Wacker Innsbruck.

In January 2017, Gugganig was sent on loan to league rivals WSG Wattens.

After the loan ended, he stayed with WSG. He won promotion to the Austrian Football Bundesliga with the club as the First League champion in 2018–19, after which the club was renamed WSG Tirol. In four-and-a-half years at WSG, Gugganig made 126 appearances in the Bundesliga and First League.

On 14 June 2021, he signed a two-year contract with Wolfsberger AC.

Personal life
His older brother Lukas Gugganig is also a football player.

References

External links
 

1997 births
Austrian people of Slavic descent
Footballers from Carinthia (state)
People from Spittal an der Drau
Living people
Austrian footballers
Austria youth international footballers
Austria under-21 international footballers
Association football defenders
FC Liefering players
WSG Tirol players
Wolfsberger AC players
Austrian Football Bundesliga players
2. Liga (Austria) players